Chen-Yuan Lee (December 4, 1915 – November 1, 2001), was a Taiwanese pharmacologist and political activist. He is famous for his research on snake venom. He was a recipient of the prestigious Redi Award from the International Society on Toxinology (IST), and was also a former president of the society. He was a former dean of the National Taiwan University College of Medicine. After his retirement from researching, he focused on participating in the Taiwan independence movement and many democratic movement. Lee had founded many political organizations such as the "100 Action Union" (100行動聯盟), Foundation of Medical Professionals Alliance in Taiwan. He was also the first chairperson of the Taiwan Independence Party.

Early years 
Lee was born in Takao Prefecture (present-day Kaohsiung), Taiwan in 1915. Both of his parents were from Tainan. Lee chose to become a medical doctor after his father and three of his siblings died of malaria and infectious diseases.

Lee grew up in Tainan, where he had outstanding grades. After graduating from the Tainan Prefecture Second High School (now the National Tainan First Senior High School), he attended the Taihoku School of Higher Education (臺北高等學校). He entered the medical department of Taihoku Imperial University in 1936, and became one of the first graduates from the department.

Lee enjoyed basic medical studies after entering the medical department. He finished his first research paper in his freshman year, which was published in the Taiwanese Medical Magazine (台灣醫學雜誌). After graduating in 1940, Lee decided to quit clinical medicine and keep on studying. He became the assistant of Tu Tsung-ming, who was researching on basic medical studies and, at the time, the only Taiwanese professors in the medical department. He once said, To gain honor for Taiwan, dignity for the Taiwanese, I chose to follow Professor Tu instead of several other Japanese professors. Because I thought Professor Tu was our people, and we should help him.

Career and achievements 
The first research Lee did after becoming Tu's assistant was the "Using Kushenji (苦蔘子) to cure dysentery." He discovered that the glycosides contained in the Kushenji can be used to kill an amoeba, and solved a Chinese herbological myth on how the Kushenji cures dysentery. In 1945, Lee published a research paper with a title of "The Toxicological Research on the Venom of Daboia" (鎖鏈蛇蛇毒的毒物學研究), the paper was world's first paper to explain the cause of death by the venom of Daboia. Because of this outstanding achievement, Lee was recognized by getting his medical doctor degree. This recognition began his career as researching snake venom.

In 1952, Lee was financially supported by the Economic Cooperation Administration (美援會) and was sent to the University of Pennsylvania Medical School for further education. This was his first time studying abroad. Lee originally wanted to do research on the circulatory system, but because of the limitation of time, his instructor Carl F. Schmidt suggested that he change his topic to pulmonary circulation. After researching at the University of Pennsylvania, he transferred to Wayne State University in Detroit, where he visited Walter Segeers's lab for two months and published a small-sized research paper.

After Lee's return to Taiwan, he started his job as a leader at the pharmacology lab of National Taiwan University due to the dimission of Tsungming Tu. In 1963, Lee worked with Chang Chuan-chung (張傳炯), a chemist, and separated the deadly α-type and β-type bungarotoxins of the venom of Bungarus multicinctus. This was a big step in neuroscience, medical science, and pharmacology.

Over the years, Lee had published over a hundred research papers. He not only became a leader of pharmacology in Taiwan, but also an international authority in the field of venom snake research. In 1970, he was elected a member of Academia Sinica, the national academy of Taiwan. He was the second person employed by National Taiwan University's College of Medicine to be elected to Academia Sinica. He became the dean of the National Taiwan University College of Medicine in 1972. Four years later, he was awarded the "Redi Prize" by the International Society on Toxinology. In 1979, he received an invitation from Springer Science+Business Media to serve as the chief editor for the books Chemistry of Protein Toxins in Snake Venoms and The Action of Snake Venoms on Nerve and Muscle, which established his high position in researching snake venom. In 1985, he chosen to serve as the president of the International Society on Toxinology, and became one of the few Taiwanese scholars to lead an international research organization.

Nobel Prize laureate Yuan T. Lee wrote in the foreword of the book The Story of Snake Venom Research in Taiwan (台灣蛇毒傳奇) that he once had ask another Nobel Prize laureate Joseph L. Goldstein, "In the Taiwanese life science field, whose research is recognized internationally?" Without the least hesitation, Goldstein answered, "Chen-Yuan Lee is internationally recognized."

Lee retired in 1986 from National Taiwan University College of Medicine, and was immediately named a professor emeritus by the university.

Entry into politics 
In March 1990, over 300,000 students participated in the Wild Lily student movement for democratic reform. Lee, who was almost eighty years old, accompanied the protesting students. This was his first time participating in a political movement.

In 1991, along with several colleagues, Chen-Yuan Lee visited Ying-Yuan Lee and Kuo Pei-hung (郭倍宏), two Taiwan Independence supporters and alumni of the National Taiwan University who were arrested for "planning to revolt" (預備叛亂罪) and were detained in the Tucheng Detention Center (土城看守所). Later, he felt that the "Regulation for Rebellions" (懲治叛亂條例) and "Criminal Law Article 100" (刑法第100條) impeded the democratic development of Taiwan because they were simply tools to help Kuomintang dominate Taiwan. As a result, he organized the "100 Action Union," which stands for the abolishment of "Criminal Law Article 100." He, as a member of Academia Sinica, joined a sit-down demonstration, leading the "100 Action Union" and successfully expressed the Taiwanese people's desire for human rights.

References
符文美，nd, a，蛇毒研究，見李鎮源教授：一位堅持理念之學者 從醫學研究到社會改革 [online]。台北：教育部健康醫學學習網。[引用於2004年12月31日]。全球資訊網網址：。
符文美，nd, b，民主運動與社會改革，見李鎮源教授：一位堅持理念之學者 從醫學研究到社會改革 [online]。台北：教育部健康醫學學習網。[引用於2004年12月31日]。全球資訊網網址：。
符文美，nd, c，重要經歷及學術榮譽，見李鎮源教授：一位堅持理念之學者 從醫學研究到社會改革 [online]。台北：教育部健康醫學學習網。[引用於 2004年12月31日]。全球資訊網網址：。
李瓊月，1995，台灣醫界大師：李鎮源。台北：玉山社。
Lee, Chen-yuan. eds. 1979. Handbook of Experimental Pharmacology: Snake Venoms. Berlin: Springer-Verlag. 
楊美珍，2001，中研院士李鎮源 獲頒賴和特別獎 [online]。台北：自由新聞網。5月28日 [引用於2004年12月31日]。全球資訊網網址：。
楊玉齡、羅時成，1996，蛇毒權威李鎮源院士 [online]。台北：天下遠見出版股份有限公司：科學文化頻道。[引用於2004年12月31日]。全球資訊網網址：。
自由時報，2001，一生奉獻台灣 中研院院士李鎮源病逝 [online]。Washington, D.C.：Formosan Association for Public Affairs。11月2日 [引用於2004年11月17日]。全球資訊網網址：。

Notes 

1915 births
2001 deaths
National Taiwan University alumni
Senior Advisors to President Chen Shui-bian
Taiwan independence activists
Taiwanese pharmacologists
Wayne State University faculty
Politicians of the Republic of China on Taiwan from Kaohsiung
Members of Academia Sinica
Taiwan Independence Party chairpersons
Taiwanese university and college faculty deans